Progress M-26M, identified by NASA as Progress 58P, is a Progress spacecraft used by Roskosmos to resupply the International Space Station (ISS) during 2015. Progress M-26M was launched on a six-hours rendezvous profile towards the ISS. The 26th Progress-M 11F615A60 spacecraft to be launched, it had the serial number 426 and was built by RKK Energia.

Launch
The spacecraft was launched on 17 February 2015 at 11:00:17 UTC from the Baikonur Cosmodrome in Kazakhstan.

Docking
Progress M-26M docked with the Zvezda service module on 17 February 2015 at 16:57 UTC, less than six hours after launch.

In May 2015, Progress was used to reboost the station. First try was automatically aborted by the craft one second into the burn. Russian flight controllers identified a problem in one of its eight thrusters. A second try with seven thrusters succeeded lasting 32 minutes and 3 seconds.

Cargo
The Progress spacecraft carried 2370 kg of cargo and supplies to the International Space Station. The craft delivered food, fuel and supplies, including 435 kg of propellant, 50 kg of oxygen, 420 kg of water, and 1465 kg of spare parts, supplies and experiment hardware for the six members of the Expedition 42 crew. Progress M-26M remained docked to Zvezda for six months.

See also

 2015 in spaceflight

References

External links

Progress (spacecraft) missions
Spacecraft launched in 2015
Spacecraft which reentered in 2015
2015 in Russia
Spacecraft launched by Soyuz-U rockets
Supply vehicles for the International Space Station